Dadaglobe was an anthology of the Dada movement slated for publication in 1921, but abandoned for financial and other reasons and never published. At 160 pages with over a hundred reproductions of artworks and over a hundred texts by some fifty artists in ten countries, Dadaglobe was to have documented Dada's apogee as an artistic and literary movement of international breadth. Edited by Dada co-founder Tristan Tzara (1896-1963) in Paris, Dadaglobe was not conceived as a summary of the movement since its founding in 1916, but rather meant to be a snapshot of its expanded incarnation at war's end. Not merely a vehicle for existing works, the project functioned as one of Dada's most generative catalysts for the production of new works.

History

The Dadaglobe solicitation letter, sent from Paris in early November 1920, requested four types of visual submissions—photographic portraits (which could be manipulated, but should "retain clarity"); original drawings; photographs of artworks; and designs for book pages—along with prose, poetry, or other verbal "inventions."  Contributors included Jean (Hans) Arp, Marcel Duchamp, Max Ernst, George Grosz, John Heartfield, Hannah Höch, Francis Picabia, Man Ray, Kurt Schwitters, and Sophie Taeuber among others (see full list of contributors below).

 Some of Dada's most iconic artworks were created in direct response to the Dadaglobe solicitation letter: Ernst's self-portrait montage commonly known as Dadamax (The Punching Ball or the Immortality of Buonarroti) and his Chinese Nightingale, Taeuber's Dada Head, and Baargeld's Typical Vertical Mess as Depiction of the Dada Baargeld are just a few examples. These works were conceived by the artists with their presentation in reproduction foremost in mind. Dadaglobe was to have been a manifesto on the revised status of the artwork in reproduction.

The volume was advertised in Duchamp's and Man Ray's journal New York Dada in 1921: "Order from the publishing house 'La Sirène' 7 rue Pasquier, Paris, DADAGLOBE, the work of dadas from all over the world […] The incalculable number of pages of reproductions and of text is a guarantee of the success of the book."  When André Breton, later founder of Surrealism, saw the intended contents of the book, he remarked: "The grand album 'Dadaglobe' […] will soon appear. […] After the publication of this volume it will be impossible to contest Dada's artistic value."

In scope, ambition, and even title, Tzara's Paris-based Dadaglobe, was modeled on Richard Huelsenbeck's Berlin-based, Dadaco, planned the previous year, but also abandoned and never published. Dadaglobe reached an advanced stage of planning before financial and interpersonal obstacles put a halt to the project in spring 1921.

Dadaglobe Reconstructed
Numerous archival traces provide an indication of the intended contents of Dadaglobe. The French scholar Michel Sanouillet (1924-2015) rediscovered the abandoned project and, in 1966, published a selection of the texts intended for the original anthology. On the occasion of Dada's centennial in 2016, American scholar Adrian Sudhalter published Dadaglobe Reconstructed, a book that includes a 160-page reconstruction of Dadaglobe within a scholarly context, accompanied by a preface by Sanouillet. The publication accompanies Sudhalter's exhibition of the same name, on view at the Kunsthaus Zürich (February 5-May 1, 2016) and The Museum of Modern Art, New York (June 12-September 18, 2016).

Participants
Participants in Dadaglobe included:

 Louis Aragon (1897-1982), France
 Jean Arp (1886-1966), Germany, France
 Johannes Baader (1875 –1955), Germany
 Johannes Theodor Baargeld (1892–1927), Germany
 Egidio Bacchi (1897-1963), Italy
 Erwin Blumenfeld (1897–1969), Germany, Netherlands, France, USA 
Constantin Brâncuși (1876-1957), Romania, France
 André Breton (1896-1966), France
 Gabrielle Buffet-Picabia (1881-1985), France
 Margueritte Buffet
 Gino Cantarelli (1899 – 1950). Italy
 Serge Charchoune (1889-1975), Russia, France
 Paul Citroen (1896-1983), Germany, Netherlands
 Jean Cocteau (1889-1963), France
 Jean Crotti (1886-1951), France, USA
 Paul Dermée (1886-1951), Belgium, France
 Theo van Doesburg (1883-1931) Netherlands
 Marcel Duchamp (1887-1968), France
 Suzanne Duchamp (1889-1963), France
 Jacques Edwards
 Paul Éluard (1895-1952), France
 Max Ernst (1891-1976), Germany, USA
 Julius Evola (1898-1974), Italy
 Aldo Fiozzi
 Elsa von Freytag-Loringhoven (1874-1927), Germany, USA
 Otto Griebel (1895-1972), Germany
 George Grosz (1893-1959), Germany, France, USA
 Job Haubric
 Raoul Hausmann (1886-1971), Germany
 John Heartfield (1891-1968), Germany, USSR, Czechoslovakia, Great Britain
 Hannah Höch (1889-1978), Germany
 Richard Huelsenbeck (1892-1974), Germany
 Marcel Janco (1895-1984), Romania, Israel
 Adon Lacroix (1887–1975), Belgium, USA
 Clément Pansaers (1885-1922), Belgium
 Benjamin Péret (1899-1959), France
 Francis Picabia (1879-1953), France
 Man Ray (1890-1976), France, USA
 Georges Ribemont-Dessaignes (1884-1974), France
 Jacques Rigaut (1898-1929), France
 Kurt Schwitters (1887-1948), Germany
 Philippe Soupault (1897-1990), France
 Joseph Stella (1877-1946), Italy, USA
 Luise Straus (Armada von Duldgedalzen) (1893-1944), Germany
 Sophie Taeuber-Arp (1889-1943), Switzerland, France
 Guillermo de Torre (1900-1971), Spain, France, Argentina
 Tristan Tzara (1896-1963), Romania, France
 Alfred Vagts (1892-1986), Germany, USA 
 Edgar Varèse (1883–1965), France, USA
 Melchoir Vischer (1895-1975), Germany
 Fried-Hardy Worm

See also
Dada
New York Dada

References

External links

The International Dada Archive - at the University of Iowa has early Dada periodicals and includes online scans of publications
Dadart - includes history, bibliography, documents, and news
 New York dada (magazine), Marcel Duchamp and Man Ray, April, 1921, Bibliothèque Kandinsky, Centre Pompidou (access online)

Dada
20th-century French literature
20th-century German literature